Grinnell Company-General Fire Extinguisher Company Complex is a historic factory complex located at Charlotte, Mecklenburg County, North Carolina. It was built in 1929–1930, and consists of a two-story office building and massive tall, one-story Grinnell manufacturing building.  The office building is a reinforced concrete structure, with a brick veneer, a flat roof, and a parapet capped in concrete coping.  The manufacturing building has a poured concrete slab foundation, brick veneered walls, a steel framing system consisting of I-beam piers and heavy Pratt truss roof, banks of continuous, steel sash windows, and large, sawtooth monitors. The complex was built for the largest manufacturer of automatic sprinklers and other fire protection products in North America.

It was added to the National Register of Historic Places in 2003.

References

Industrial buildings and structures on the National Register of Historic Places in North Carolina
Industrial buildings completed in 1930
Buildings and structures in Charlotte, North Carolina
National Register of Historic Places in Mecklenburg County, North Carolina
Tyco International